Henrik Skougaard (3 May 1910 – 23 August 1995) was a Norwegian equestrian. He competed in two events at the 1936 Summer Olympics.

References

External links
 

1910 births
1995 deaths
Norwegian male equestrians
Olympic equestrians of Norway
Equestrians at the 1936 Summer Olympics
People from Rakkestad
Sportspeople from Viken (county)